MS Star Clipper was a Norwegian-owned bulk carrier built by Kockums in Malmö, Sweden in 1968. In 1981 she was sold and her name changed to Star Lanao. She was scrapped in India in 1986.

Almö Bridge Disaster
She is best known for causing the Almö Bridge disaster when sailing into Uddevalla, Sweden, in bad weather.

See also
 - Similar Incident To Star Clipper. 
 - Also Collided In A Same Year With An Original Sunshine Skyway Bridge.
 - Aircraft Transporter Ship Collided In 2012 With Eggner Ferry Bridge In Kentucky Lake Under Similar Incident.
List of bridge disasters

References

Merchant ships of Norway
Maritime incidents in 1980
Maritime incidents in Sweden
Ships built in Malmö
1968 ships